Fabio Piscopiello (born 16 February 1985) is an Italian former professional road cyclist.

Major results
2008
 9th Giro Valli Aretine
2009
 1st Stage 5 Girobio
 4th Gran Premio Folignano
2010
 1st Coppa della Pace
 2nd Gran Premio Folignano
 9th Trofeo Internazionale Bastianelli

References

1985 births
Living people
Italian male cyclists
Sportspeople from the Province of Lecce
Cyclists from Apulia
21st-century Italian people